Pseudofluda is a genus of South American jumping spiders that was first described by Cândido Firmino de Mello-Leitão in 1928.  it contains only three species, found only in Brazil and Argentina: P. capandegui, P. pergeri, and P. pulcherrima. The name is a combination of the Ancient Greek "pseudo-", meaning "false", and the salticid genus name Fluda.

The cephalothorax is chestnut-colored to black, with a chestnut colored spot on the posterior region. A white line goes along the length of the cephalothorax. The back of the abdomen is tawny with violet and green metallic scales. The species was first found in Petropolis, Brazil.

See also
Fluda
Parafluda

References

Monotypic Salticidae genera
Salticidae
Spiders of Brazil
Taxa named by Cândido Firmino de Mello-Leitão